Fighter Squadron 38 or VF-38 was an aviation unit of the United States Navy. Originally established on 20 June 1943, it was disestablished on 31 January 1946. It was the only US Navy squadron to be designated as VF-38.

Operational history
VF-38 equipped with the F6F Hellcat supported the New Georgia Campaign deploying to Henderson Field on Guadalcanal in September 1943. While deployed in the Solomon Islands during 1943 VF-38 shot down 7 Japanese aircraft.

See also
History of the United States Navy
List of inactive United States Navy aircraft squadrons
List of United States Navy aircraft squadrons

References

Strike fighter squadrons of the United States Navy